JS Samidare (DD-106) is the sixth  of the Japan Maritime Self-Defense Force (JMSDF). She was commissioned on 21 March 2000.

Design
In the Murasame class, the hull design was completely renovated from first-generation destroyers. In addition to increasing the size in order to reduce the underwater radiation noise, both the superstructure and hull were inclined to reduce the radar cross-section. However, there is no angled tripod mainmast as on American s because of the heavy weather of the Sea of Japan in winter. Destroyers built under the First Defense Build-up Plan, including the former , adopted a unique long forecastle style called "Oranda-zaka".

The engine arrangement is COGAG, same as in the Asagiri class, but a pair of engines were updated to Spey SM1Cs, and the remaining pair were replaced by LM2500s, as used in the Kongō class.

Construction and career
Samidare was laid down on 11 September 1997, by Ishikawajima Harima Heavy Industries at Tokyo as part of the 1995 plan and launched on 24 September 1998. Commissioned on 21 March 2000, the vessel was incorporated into the 4th Escort Corps and deployed to Kure.

Samidare was deployed to Somalia in 2009 as part of multinational efforts to protect ships passing through the Indian Ocean alongside .

Samidare destroyer participated in Japan-US-India Joint Training (Malabar 2019) from 26 September to 4 October 2019. Exercises were carried out in the sea and airspace from Sasebo to the south of the Kanto region. , a P-8A aircraft, and a submarine from the United States Navy, and a P-8I aircraft from the Indian Navy participated in anti-submarine warfare training, anti-submarine warfare training, conducted anti-water shooting training, anti-aircraft shooting training, and offshore replenishment training.

On 16 October of the same year, Samidare conducted communication training using radio with the Chinese Navy destroyer  (which was scheduled to participate in the JMSDF Fleet review on 14 October, but canceled due to Typhoon Hagibis) in the Pacific Ocean south of Kanto region. This was the third Japan-China goodwill training for the JMSDF, the previous being in December 2011.

On 4 May 2022, Samidare deployed to Djibouti for anti-piracy operations.

Gallery

Citations

References 

 
 
 Saunders, Stephen. IHS Jane's Fighting Ships 2013-2014. Jane's Information Group (2003). 

1998 ships
Murasame-class destroyers (1994)
Ships built by IHI Corporation